El Segundo most often refers to El Segundo, California.

El Segundo may also refer to:
 El Segundo (horse)
 El Segundo blue butterfly
 El Segundo High School
 El Segundo Unified School District
 El Segundo (LACMTA station)
 El Segundo Boulevard
 El Segundo Freeway, name for Interstate 105 in California